Johannes Mentelin, sometimes also spelled Mentlin, (born around 1410 in Schlettstadt, today Sélestat; died December 12, 1478 in Strasbourg) was a pioneering German book printer and bookseller active during the period during which incunabula were printed.

Life 
In 1447, Johannes Mentelin gained the rights of a Strasbourg citizen. He was first a Goldschreiber (calligrapher and book scribe) by profession and worked in addition as an episcopal notary. Exactly when and where he learned the technique of book printing is not known. Since at the end of the 1450s, when Mentelin founded his Strasbourg printery, there was still no other place where printing was done besides Mainz, it is likely that he either got his knowledge directly there or through a middleman. Such a go-between might have been Heinrich Eggestein. It is suspected that he had been introduced to the trade of book printing during his stay in Mainz from Johannes Gutenberg. He did not set up his own Offizin (an old German term for a book printing company) until the middle of the 1460s. Due to a lack of sources, the final clarification of this question must unfortunately remain unanswered for now. From the available data, it can however be concluded that Mentelin was the first book printer active in Strasbourg (and thus one of the first anywhere in Europe), even before Eggestein.

The first printing which carries Mentelin's name is Augustine's Tractatus de arte praedicandi from the year 1465. However, it is assumed that Mentelin had already begun to print significantly earlier, probably even already in 1458. His oldest known printed work is a Latin Bible printed with 49 lines per page ("B49"), whose first volume is dated 1460. As Gutenberg's Bible was printed with 42 lines per page, Mentelin's had fewer pages and proved handier.

Mentelin quickly achieved business success, which made him a prosperous man. In 1466, he was even awarded a coat of arms by Emperor Frederick III. After about 20 years as a book printer, Mentelin died on December 12, 1478 in Strasbourg. He was buried in the cemetery of the (no longer existing) St.-Michael's-Chapel. His grave was later removed and is now inside Strasbourg Cathedral. One of daughters married the book printer Martin Schott, and another married Adolf Rusch. The latter, also called the printer with the bizarre R, took over the Offizin.

Work 

About 40 printed works are ascribed to Mentelin's Strasbourg Offizin. His printing and publishing list contained predominantly theological and philosophical works in Latin, whose purity of text was ensured by scholarly proofreaders. Among others, works of Augustine, Thomas Aquinas, Aristotle, John Chrysostom, Isidore of Seville and Albertus Magnus were issued. In 1472 he published the Postilla super totam Bibliam, Nicolaus de Lyra's commentary of the Bible. Mentelin also published texts of classical antiquity (such as Virgil's Opera and the Comoediae of Terence). As the only German book printer, Mentelin printed Medieval court literature, such as Wolfram von Eschenbach's Parzival and Der jüngere Titurel ("The Younger Titurel")  of Albrecht von Scharfenberg.

His first printing of a Bible in vernacular language stands out, the so-called Mentelin Bible of 1466, the first attested edition of the full Bible in the German language, translated from the Vulgate, and one of the earliest printed works in German. The Mentelin Bible was the basis for a further thirteen pre-Reformation editions of the Bible (including those by Zainer and Sorg) which appeared in southern Germany before editions of the Luther Bible, based on Hebrew and Greek, from 1522.

Literature 
 .
 .
 .
 .

References

External links 
 
 Johannes Mentelin in the Humanist Library of Sélestat
  (Universitätsbibliothek of Freiburg im Breisgau)
 Johannes Mentelin In Allgemeine Deutsche Biographie (ADB). Vol. 21, p. 370. In German
 Mentelin in the Catholic Encyclopedia
 Inkunabelkatalog Deutscher Bibliotheken (Incunabulum Catalog of German Libraries, INKA): List of the printed works of Mentelin accessible. In German.
 Saint Augustine, of Hippo. De arte praedicandi. Strassburg: Johann Mentelin, not after 1466, at The Library of Congress.

1410 births
1478 deaths
People from Sélestat
Printers of incunabula
German typographers and type designers
German printers
German calligraphers
Alsatian-German people
Medieval European scribes
German booksellers
Medieval German merchants
15th-century German businesspeople